Cassandra Go (2 April 1996 – 23 June 2021) was a grey Thoroughbred mare from Indian Ridge, out of the mare Rahaam by Secreto. She was a retired racehorse, who was previously a top-class sprinter.

Racing career
Cassandra Go's wins consisted of the Temple Stakes, King's Stand Stakes, and the King George Stakes. She was retired to become a breeding mare.

Breeding record
One of her most notable offspring is Halfway to Heaven, who won the Nassau Stakes. Cassandra Go died on 23 June 2021 at the age of 25.

Pedigree

References 

1996 racehorse births
2021 racehorse deaths
Racehorses bred in Ireland
Racehorses trained in the United Kingdom
Thoroughbred family 3-d
Byerley Turk sire line